This is a list of islands of West Virginia.

See also
List of islands on the Potomac River

Islands in West Virginia, List of
West Virginia
West Virginia